Valerio Catellini (born ) is an Italian male  track cyclist, riding for the national team. He competed in the team sprint event at the 2010 UCI Track Cycling World Championships.

References

External links
 Profile at cyclingarchives.com

1991 births
Living people
Italian track cyclists
Italian male cyclists
Place of birth missing (living people)